Silk-FAW Automotive, founded in 2021, is a joint venture between Chinese auto manufacturer FAW group and Italy based Silk EV.  Based in Reggio Emilia, Silk-FAW automotive plans to invest up to US$1.2 billion to design, develop and build high performance electric cars with production planned in Italy as well as China.

In 2021 Silk-FAW started production on its first car, the Hongqi S9. Designed by Walter de Silva, the S9 features a hybrid powertrain with a 4-liter twin-turbocharged V8, which produces over 1,300 Horsepower and a top speed of close to 250 MPH. Silk-FAW plans to manufacture a line of 'S' cars, the S3, 35, and S7 respectively.

References

External links 

Italian companies established in 2021
Automotive companies established in 2021
Companies based in Reggio Emilia
Car manufacturers of Italy
Italian brands
Luxury motor vehicle manufacturers
Sports car manufacturers
Vehicle manufacturing companies established in 2021
FAW Group brands